Niharika Desai (born c. 1977) is a television editor and a VJ on MTV Desi.

She grew up in Poughkeepsie, New York, and graduated from the University of Pennsylvania.

References

External links
 
 http://www.asiansinmedia.org/news/article.php/television/1011

1970s births
Living people
American television personalities
University of Pennsylvania alumni
Gujarati people
American musicians of Indian descent
American women musicians of Indian descent
American Hindus
Place of birth missing (living people)
21st-century American women musicians